Live in Atlanta features Destiny's Child performing live in Atlanta, Georgia at Philips Arena on July 15, 2005 during their Destiny Fulfilled ... And Lovin' It which sponsored by McDonald's, it is also known as the last tour of Destiny's Child. It has been released on March 28, 2006 in the United States. The DVD debuted at #1 on the Billboard Music DVD charts breaking record sales about 500,000 copies at first week, instead of those numbers Nielsen SoundScan tracked sales of 50,000 because the restrictions about retail, international deliveries and e-packages, Recording Industry Association of America already certified the DVD as Platinum.

Track listing

Track listing

Remix CD (available only on Japanese version)
 "Cater 2 U" (Storch Remix Edit) – 4:09
 "Survivor" (Azza's Soul Remix Radio Edit) – 3:57
 "Bootylicious" (M&J's Jelly Remix) – 3:41
 "Stand Up For Love" (Maurice's Nu Soul Mix) – 7:15
 "Girl" (JS Club Mix) – 6:42
 "Lose My Breath" (Paul Johnson's Club Mix) – 6:07

Bonus features
 Destiny's Child – A Family Affair
 Fan Testimonials (Favorite Song, Cater 2 U – The Chosen Few, Favorite Costumes, The Show)
 Kelly Rowland Sophomore CD Teaser
  Dreamgirls Movie & Soundtrack Trailer

Bonus audio tracks
 "Flashback" (featuring Kelly Rowland)
 "Check on It" (Remix) featuring Beyoncé (Bun B & Slim Thug)
 "Let's Stay Together" (featuring Michelle Williams)

Bonus music videos
 "Check on It" featuring Beyoncé (Bun B & Slim Thug)
 "Stand Up for Love" (Japan only)
 "Girl" (Japan only)
 "Cater 2 U"

Special features
PCM Stereo
Dolby Digital 5.1 Surround

Charts

Weekly charts

Year-end charts

Certifications

References

Live in Atlanta
Destiny's Child albums
Live video albums
2006 video albums
2006 live albums
Columbia Records live albums
Columbia Records video albums